United States gubernatorial elections were held in 1891, in seven states.

Kentucky and Maryland held their gubernatorial elections in odd numbered years, every 4 years, preceding the United States presidential election year.  Massachusetts and Rhode Island both elected its governors to a single-year term, which they would abandon in 1920 and 1912, respectively. Iowa and Ohio at this time held gubernatorial elections in every odd numbered year.

New York at this time elected its governors to a three-year term. This was the last election in which this was the case, switching to two-year terms from the 1894 elections.

In Kentucky, the gubernatorial election was held in August for the last time; the next gubernatorial election would be held on the same day as federal elections.

Results

References

Notes

Bibliography 
 
 
 
 
 

 
November 1891 events